The Men's scratch event of the 2015 UCI Track Cycling World Championships was held on 19 February 2015.

Results
The race was started at 21:10.

References

Men's scratch
UCI Track Cycling World Championships – Men's scratch